The following is a list of fictional characters who appear in Akira Miyashita's manga series Sakigake!! Otokojuku.

Otokojuku 
 is a private boys' school in Tokyo, established over 300 years ago. The headmaster Heihachi Edajima gathers delinquents from all over Japan and trains them to become the leaders of the next generation.

Amongst the students, the  first years are viewed as slaves, the second years as oni, and the third years as Enma. The third years take instruction from the headmaster alone, as the rest of the instructors are not at the same level as them and can not outpower them enough to punish them.

Otokojuku Specialties
The outside world is told that these are average school events and special lessons, but in actuality they are various torture methods and duels. A few specialties are known of outside the school, as evident when Hidemaro knew of the Oil Bath before enrolling.

Main Specialties

Kyoura Daiyon Kyousatsu
(驚邏大四凶殺, The Four Great Astonishing Assaults)

Otokojuku's greatest specialty, used to settle disputes between two teams of four. The entrance is the 1,000-year-old , which leads to the skeleton and corpse littered . At the check-points, each team chooses one representative to take part in a fight.

Edajima is the only survivor in its 300-year history, having achieved a magnificent victory 50 years ago in 1950 (Shōwa 25). Inside Otokojuku is a memorial stone monument in honor of those who lost their lives.

The footing is only countless protruding rocks scattered across the place, and those that fall end up in a thousand degree temperature manganese acidic sulfur spring. Site of J vs. Raiden.

Both men dangle from a rope with no footing, but the rope itself is made of steel, so there is no chance of it breaking. Site of Togashi vs. Hien.

 A fight in the  ice ring inside the  cave which in on the  land bridge. With icicles sharper than knives waiting below, the temperature from the flames lit on the ceiling causes the ring to gradually melt, eventually resulting in the fighters falling to the icicles. Site of Toramaru vs. Gekkou.

Site of Momo vs. Date.

Dai Ishin Pa-Lien Seiha
(大威震八連制覇, The Great Pa-Lien (Unified Eight) Quaking Conquest)

Though not specified as an Otokojuku Specialty, it is a martial arts tournament held once every three years connected to Otokojuku. It is Otokojuku's greatest fighting event, and whoever controls the Dai Ishin Pa-Lien Seiha also controls Otokojuku. The previous champion team chooses their opponent team, and Jaki has used this tournament to maintain his authority over the past 10 years.

Furthermore, the 8 on 8 tournament is carried out in four 2 on 2 tag matches, and each two-man team is decided in the Takushouseki ceremony. But, participants are capable of switching their members around if the opposing team agrees to it.

Students

1st Year Students

Momotaro Tsurugi 
(剣 桃太郎, Tsurugi Momotarō)

.

Also known as Momo. The main character and the strongest of the 1st Years, later the Otokojuku Representative. He is fluent in multiple languages and is a master of various secret techniques, always wears a white hachimaki, carries around a katana, has a laid-back attitude and sense of humor and often dozes off during class. Very little is known about his past or how he got so strong. In the past, he trained at a temple to learn the Shoukyuu Soudan, and his son Shishimaru in Akatsuki!! Otokojuku underwent the same training. After graduating from Otokojuku, he enrolled in University of Tokyo, and after that he studied abroad at Harvard University. In Akatsuki!! Otokojuku he works for the Prime Minister of Japan.

 Momo crushes an opponent's fist by striking it with his own fist during their punch.

 Momo's sword techniques which excel at both offense and defense.

 An iai strike performed while blinded.

 Used in the fight against Shu Kougen. Momo covers his eyes with his hachimaki, draws a circle in the snow with his own blood, and strikes anyone he senses entering it.

 When an opponent with a katana strikes continuously, Momo strikes at all of their limbs and steals their fighting spirit.

 Momo thrusts his katana into the ground and move onto it at high speed. This technique requires tough tendons, remarkable balance, and excellent taijutsu.

 Momo grabs his katana between his toes and jumps high into the air, and performs a dropping attack be spinning fiercely.

 Momo performs a handstand on his katana and spins around, creating a sudden gust of wind.

 Momo concentrates his ki into his sword blade and sends out a shockwave in the shape of a tiger. Because the overwhelming destructive power exhausts so much ki, it can only be used for a short period of time.

 Battle tactics that rely on ki. When Momo exhausts a large amount of physical strength, his ki runs out as well and he sweats profusely.

 Momo injects his hachimaki with his ki and can use it as a blade for an instant.

 A defense technique where Momo focuses all of his ki into his chest. For an instant his chest becomes like an iron plate, and not even Jaki's Shinkuu Senpuu Shou can hurt him.

 A secret attack where Momo can freely manipulate his opponent's entire body. Momo was one of three successors to the technique, but because the technique is rather cruel and meant for trifling with opponent's lives he usually keeps it sealed away. See Sou Reigen for more information.

Genji Togashi 
(富樫 源次, Togashi Genji)

, Hideo Ishikawa (PS3 game).

The leader of the Otokojuku Shock Corps and a close friend of Momo since the beginning of class. He is a brawler and uses a dosu knife. He always wears a tattered school hat, which is a memento from his late older brother Genkichi who was killed years ago in the same battleground where Togashi fights Senkuu. He has a scar underneath his right eye from a fight 3 years before enrolling in Otokojuku. He does not have any formal martial arts training, but he shows an incredible fighting spirit. Although he has great fights against Hien and Senkuu, he later becomes a comical character and mostly serves as a commentator with Toramaru. He is well known for risking his life and seeming to die, only to return alive and well later. In Akatsuki!! Otokojuku he has become Edajima's secretary. Additionally, his father, Genzo Togashi, appears in Peerless: The Legend of Edajima Heihachi as an ace pilot for the Imperial Japanese Navy.

Combo Techniques
 Used when teamed up with Toramaru.

Ryuji Toramaru 
(虎丸 龍次, Toramaru Ryūji)

.

A comical guy with herculean strength and a big appetite. He claims to practice Mouko-ryuu Kenpo, but in actuality it is just his own style of Kenpo. Because he farted in the face of an instructor the day he enrolled, he was accuses of treason and forced to hold up a 200 kg suspended ceiling for half a year. Although initially depicted as strong enough to knock out Momo and break off a piece of the ice ring with a single punch, he later mostly serves as a commentator with Togashi. Though he accepts this position and even calls himself the "Eternal Commentator of Otokojuku", whenever he does fight again he fights bravely. His specialty is sumo and he was a yokozuna back in his hometown. He will often fight wearing only his fundoshi. His father Ryuta appears in Peerless: The Legend of Edajima Heihachi in a maximum-security army prison, holding a suspended ceiling, the same way his son was introduced.

 Toramaru's own style of kenpo.

 Toramaru strikes the back of his opponent's head with a handblade. This technique was good enough to knock out Momo.

 Toramaru jumps up and performs a two step kick. It is never made clear how he lands afterwards.

 The secret of Moukou-ryuu. A powerful fart that with a wind speed that can launch Toramaru 100 meters.

 Toramaru ignites his Dai Houhi with a lighter.

 Toramaru's kusarigama attached to an iron ball. It swings powerfully well, but is eventually smashed to pieces by Amon and Unmon. After that he only uses the sickle part.

J 
.

An American and former student of the U.S. Annapolis Naval Academy. A boxer who uses spiked knuckles made of magnum steel and has a Mach Punch. Originally depicted as one of many students who came to Japan to study abroad, after his fight with Momo he enrolls in Otokojuku. He has several times faced an opponent who was confident in their victory against him, only to be defeated in a come from behind victory by a new blow. His English catchphrase is You are not my match. In Akatsuki!! Otokojuku he is the commander in chief of the navy. Additionally, King Battler appears in Peerless: The Legend of Edajima Heihachi.

Hidemaro Gokukouji 
(極小路 秀麻呂, Gokukōji Hidemaro)

, Hiroko Emori (PS3 game).

A bratty yakuza successor who is enrolled in Otokojuku after his group crumbles due to his profligate ways. He is frequently teased for his short build, but obtains a form of personal growth by hoisting Otokojuku's massive school flag. In the anime, he disliked pro wrestling before entering Otokojuku.

The live action film focuses a lot on his experience after enrolling in Otokojuku, making him a sort of second main character after Momo.

Taio Matsuo 
(松尾 鯛雄, Matsuo Taio)

, Bin Shimada (PS3 game).

The comic relief character along with Hidemaro and Tazawa, he is also the lead yeller and bell ringer in the school's ōendan. He has an odd hairstyle, similar to the title character in Sazae-san. His bad premonitions often come true. His father, Koisachi Matsuo, appears in Peerless: The Legend of Edajima Heihachi as a similar comic relief role.

Shinichiro Tazawa 
(田沢 慎一郎, Tazawa Shinichirō)

.

The self-proclaimed "Intelligence of Otokojuku". He is also called the "Brains of Otokojuku", but he often messes up simple things like multiplication tables, making his knowledge questionable. However, he does have rare moments where a glimpse of true intelligence can be seen from him. In the Dai Ishin Paren Seiha Arc, it was his idea to form the "10,000 Man Bridge" human bridge. He was renamed  in the anime. His father, Tazawa Shintaro, appears in Peerless: The Legend of Edajima Heihachi, and much like in the original series he serves as part of the comic relief duo with Matsuo.

Kiyomi Tsubakiyama 
(椿山 清美, Tsubakiyama Kiyomi)

.

A large student with a rather timid personality. He enrolled in Otokojuku to become more manly, but because he can't endure the strict training he tries to run away, only to be caught by Umanosuke Gonda, who then fights him in the men's dorm specialty match . Midway through the match he learns that Gonda had made yakitori out of his pet , so he becomes enraged and avenges the little bird. After this he gains confidence in himself. Snow is his weakness. In the anime, he is a regular character from the first episode on and also has more lines.

2nd Year Students

Gouji Akashi 
(赤石 剛次, Akashi Gōji)

, Hikaru Midorikawa (PS3 game).

The strongest of the Otokojuku 2nd Years. He was suspended indefinitely 3 years ago on February 26 for nearly killing a 1st year student in what is referred to as the Otokojuku 2-26 Incident. Master of Ichimonji-ryuu rock splitting sword technique and carries around his sword  on his back. It is a very sturdy sword, the only time it ever cracked was when it was hit by J's Magnum Steel Knuckle. He has silver hair, although it was changed to black in the anime.

Both first and second years fear him, and even the third years recognize his great skills. He fights as a supporter for the first time in the Tenchou Gorin Dai Bukai finals. After his fight against Hornet in the Battle of the Seven Tusks, he uses his Zanganken technique in order to save the other Otokojuku students from a trap and then dies. He entrusts his katana to Momo.

After the series ends he is confirmed to have lived. His son Juuzou appears in Akatsuki!! Otokojuku.

Edogawa 
(江戸川)

.

The leader of the 2nd years in Akashi's absence. Depicted as the main tormentor of the 1st years, he usually wears an overly forced smile, but when mad his face changes to one of a furious psychotic killer. In Akatsuki!! Otokojuku, decades have passed but he has yet to graduate and therefore is still enrolled in Otokojuku.

Other 2nd years 
 : 
 :

3rd Year Students

Jaki Daigouin 
(大豪院 邪鬼, Daigōin Jaki)

.

The leader of the third years and the Otokojuku representative. Known as the Emperor of Otokojuku, he has ruled the school for over 10 years. A master of Daigouin-ryuu and Kikou Touhou. In his earlier appearances he seemed as large as a daibutsu, but it later seems as though his fighting spirit gives off the feeling that he is that large.

He has won the Dai Ishin Paren Seiha three consecutive times, and he uses his power to defend his position. In the past he challenged Edajima to a duel but suffered his first loss, and came to realize the level of Edajima's greatness.

Before his fight against Spartacus in the Tenchou Gorin, he entrusted the proof of his position as Otokojuku representative to Momo. He continues fighting even after having his heart pierced, and kills himself while finishing the fight with his Shinkuu Senpuu Shou.

In Akatsuki!! Otokojuku he is still dead and his son Kouki is an orphan. Additionally, his father Shouki appears in Peerless: The Legend of Heihachi Edajima.

Eikei 
(影慶)

, Naoki Imamura (PS3 game).

The leader and strongest of the Otokojuku . His loyalty to Jaki is very high, and not even in unconsciousness will he step on Jaki's shadow. He is a master of the Kiritsu-ryuu poison fist technique and the Kijin-ryuu weapon style. He joins Jaki in the final battle of the Paren Seiha in the Tenrai Kyoushintou against Momo & Gekkou and defeats Gekkou. In the Tenchou Gorin he is seeming killed during the Preliminary League, but returns later under the guise of Otokojuku's 2nd Supporter .

Rasetsu 
(羅刹)

 (PS2 game), Takahiro Yoshimizu (PS3 game).

One of the Otokojuku Shitennou. He has fingers that can pierce anything and is a master of Kyouke Toushiki Ha. He and Baron Dino face Date and Toramru in the Paren Seiha's Sanshou Rokkyouku Seitou. He possesses an incredible tenacity towards achieving victory at any cost. Years ago he and his platoon crossed the western country to face an old enemy and endured 3 days and 3 nights of hellish torture in a prison. In his fight against Sanen he sacrificed an arm to defeat him, a sacrifice he called a "scratch".

Manjimaru 
(卍丸)

.

One of the Otokojuku Shitennou. He is a master of Mouryouken, the most feared and darkest form of Kenpo in history. He and Henshouki face J and Raiden in the Paren Seiha's Jikan Hyaku Chuurintou. He is also a master of poisonous weapon use and conceals needles in his mask. Twice in the Tenchou Gorin he fights against two opponents in a handicap match.

Senkuu 
(センクウ)

, Ryōtarō Okiayu (PS3 game).

One of the Otokojuku Shitennou. He is a master of Mouryouken Dark Fist and Rikuke Killer Fist. He and Dokugantetsu fight Togashi and Hien in the Paren Seiha's Ryuubon Teimoutou. He is the Shitennou member with the most diverse techniques, including skills with razor sharp blades and excellent kicks. He is initially depicted as very masculine and often sweating, but is later depicted as a man of beauty, often holding a black rose in his mouth. He can use the rose as a weapon, but he is never actually shown doing so. He dislikes killing and always tries to avoid actually stabbing his enemies. He also shows respect to enemies who are willing to die to win, and even saved Togashi's life after defeating him.

Dokugantetsu 
(独眼鉄)

.

A master of Niou-ryuu with strong muscles and a poison eye. He also has a rough physique and light gymnastic moves, as well as muscles like steel that not even 1,000 pickaxes could pierce. He claims to be the one who killed Togashi's brother Genkichi.

During the battle against Rouroukan in the Tenchou Gorin Preliminary League he attacks Sou Reigen, but Sou Reigen destroys his poison eye with his Shoukyuu Soudan and breaks his spine, killing him. He is the first Otokojuku fighter to die.

In the Paren Seiha he displays a sadistic personality disorder by viciously attacking Hien repeatedly, but he is actually a shy and gentle person despite his huge body and grim face. In the anime he wears an eyepatch.

Henshouki 
(蝙翔鬼)

, Toshio Furukawa (PS3 game).

One of the Chinju Sannin-shuu, aka the  guard. A master of one of China's 3 Great Strange Attacks Nanchouji Kyoutaiken and the special techniques Tenpin Shouha and Kousou Henjutsu. His right hand is artificial and he can replace it with blades and his Tosatsu Fuusha. In the manga he had black hair, but in the anime it was changed to silver.

From his first appearance to the Paren Seiha he had puffy eyelids and the face of a sarcastic senpai character and used cowardly tactics, but in the Tenchou Gorin his face was more slender and  attractive. His tactics also changed, and he started using frontal attacks during his Kousou Henjutsu technique.

In the end he is stabbed by Centaur's unicorn horn and dies. He was able to see through Gekkou's blindness.

Baron Dino 
(男爵ディーノ, Danshaku Dīno)

, Kōji Haramaki (PS3 game).

One of the Chinju Chokurou Sannin-shuu, aka the  guard. A master of Kyokusatsu Doruben, Shisen Chouken, and Hell's Magic. His conspicuous looks include a silk hat and a kaiser moustache. He is usually a polite gentleman with courteous speech, but when he is mad he completely snaps. Though he is highly influenced by the western world, he usually wears a fundoshi. In the Tenchou Gorin Finals League he suddenly changes his fighting style to tricky tactics. He later appears alive in Akatsuki!! Otokojuku.

The wrestler Danshoku Dino named himself after this character.

New First Year Students

Souji Togo 
(東郷 総司, Tougou Souji)

A vulgar young man who wears his previous school's hat, geta, and overcoat. He survives Otokojuku's Russian roulette entrance exam and possesses such raw courage that he never hesitated to pull the trigger. He challenges Momo to decide who deserves the title Otokojuku Representative but is defeated, even with using his motorcycle as a weapon. After this, he takes part in the mission to save Edajima in the Battle of the Seven Tusks.

Former Tenchou Gorin Opponents 
For information on each, see Tenchou Gorin Dai Bukai. They are second years in the Battle of the Seven Tusks Arc.

Sou Reigen
Shu Kougen
Tou Fuketsu
Pharaoh
Hakuhou
Souketsu
Gouki Todo
Gobalski

Former Kanto Gogakuren opponents 
Omito Date
Raiden
Hien
Gekkou

Staff
 : The headmaster of Otokojuku and a former Navy Rear Admiral. He is a bull-headed kendo master teaching troubled youths to be warriors. As a child prodigy, he entered Tokyo University at a very young age with only a week's study. He fought bravely in World War II as an imperial soldier. This character is modeled after the Imperial Japanese Navy admiral Togo Heihachiro (東郷平八郎; The city of Edajima (江田島) was the site of the former Japanese Imperial Naval Academy; see :ja:海軍兵学校). Whenever he's about to deliver the coup de grâce to his enemy, he shouts his famous one-liner: . Any inquiry in regard to many of eccentric Otokojyuku rule or his decision is also answered by this one liner.

, Unshō Ishizuka (PS3 game)

 : The substitute headmaster of Otokojuku. His hair resembles a bowl of ramen and he has a  tattoo on his forehead. He is an old friend of Edajima and is about as strong as him, with enough power to fight against Kennou of the Shinken Temple. He tends to speak with only Chinese kanji whenever he appears. He excels at both medicine and genjutsu and is in charge of the students' medical treatment. He has studied 3,000-year-old Chinese secrets regarding medicine. In Peerless: The Legend of Edajima Heihachi, he meets Edajima at Tokyo Imperial University and teaches him martial arts. 
 : The main instructor of the 1st year students. His appearance is indeed that of an Oni instructor, but he is also a very petty and egotistical person. The students generally dislike him but have been known to show concern for him sometimes. When not instructing, he likes to go to Harajuku and attempt nanpa, but because of his looks women tend to run away from him. In the anime he wore a kendo outfit and became more comical to better fit Shigeru Chiba's adlibbing. His father, Oni-Hage (Demon Bald), appears in Peerless: The Legend of Edajima Heihachi. 
 : One of the other instructors, he is usually seen with Tetsu Kabuto. He dresses like a fighter pilot and has a wife and daughter (who also wear fighter pilot hats). , Naoki Imamura (PS3 game)
 : One of the other instructors, he is usually seen with Hikoubou. As his name implies, he wears an iron helmet. He also has a moustache and wears round glasses. In earlier chapters he also wore a Nazi armband.
 : The superintendent of the Otokojuku student dorms. He likes to work the students unreasonably hard. His specialty dish is escargot. 
 
 
 
 Vice Principal: An anime original character, he also acts as Edajima's secretary. 
 First Year Students' Budō Instructor:

Kanto Gogakuren 
The  is a fictional group from Akira Miyashita's manga series Sakigake!! Otokojuku.

A group formed by Omito Date after leaving Otokojuku. He leads them in an attack on Otokojuku during a festival. They then take on Momotaro and the other main first years in the Kyoura Daiyon Kyousatsu.

Members

Omito Date 
(伊達 臣人, Date Omito)

, Hiroaki Hirata (PS3 game).

The Former leader of gogakuren school army. He uses the Hakyokuryuu retractable spear. He has three scars on each side of face. He is a feminist and refuses to kill women. Long ago he was a first year at Otokojuku but left after killing an instructor. He then became the class president of the Kanto Gogakuren and led the attack against the Momo and the first years in the Kyoura Daiyon Kyousatsu. He fights and is defeated by Momo in the 4th Assault  and afterwards returns to Otokojuku. He assumes a second-in-command type role and usually fights the second strongest enemies. He was voted as the most popular character (even more popular than Momo) several times. In Ten yori Takaku and Akatsuki!! Otokojuku he has become the boss of a Bōryokudan, and his clone appears under the name Bishamonten of Hyoei Todo's Seven Lucky Gods.

Gogakuren San Menken 
(豪学連三面拳, Three Faces of Gogakuren)

The member's names come from old Japanese Army aircraft. In Akatsuki!! Otokojuku it is revealed that the Gogakuren Sanmenken are actually the 152nd Sanmenken, and the Sanmenken have existed for 2000 years, each generation chosen by phrenology, each with the same names, faces, fighting styles, and destinies as their predecessors. The 153rd Sanmenken serve the Sodom World Council.

Raiden 
(雷電, Mitsubishi J2M)

, Yasunori Masutani (PS3 game).

The leader of the Sanmenken and master of Daiou Jouryuu taijutsu, the oldest form of Chinese Kenpo in history (fictional). Uses knived shoes and fights with three monkeys later. He fights J in the Daiyon Kyousatsu 1st Assault . At first his taijutsu overwhelms J, but J ends the match in a draw with one of his Mach Punches. After this he enrolls in Otokojuku with Date and the other Sanmenken. He is very serious and loyal but has occasionally shown a comical side. He is always training in all forms of Kenpo, and therefore can usually recognize and explain all enemy's techniques or identities. He is thought to be killed in the fight with Ryoukou, the boss of the Excellent Ryouzanpaku 16, but returned alive later.

Hien 
(飛燕, Kawasaki Ki-61)

, Kazunari Tanaka (PS3 game).

One of the Sanmenken and a master of Choujinken who shows a liking for magnificent movement. He also uses throwing acupuncture needles that can manipulate an enemy's muscle movement. He usually wears a standard gakuran, but wears a Chinese fighter keikogi when fighting. He fights Togashi in the Daiyon Kyousatsu 2nd Assault . His Choujinken dominates the entire fight, but Togashi's luck and will power forces the fight to end in a draw. He has long hair and bishōnen looks. He is also very popular with female fans and is often asked by Toramaru and the others to introduce them to girls. His hobby is knitting. He is initially a narcissist, but from the Tenchou Gorin on he has a calmer personality. He shows no mercy for his enemies. His hair is a light pink color, but in the anime it is orange. In Ten yori Takaku he has become a doctor and president of the All Japan Seinen Medical Association.

Gekko 
(月光, Nakajima J1N)

. The strongest of the Senmenken. He is a master of Chakukeryuu Kenpo and also possesses a tough will and physical strength. He uses a retractable baton which he once fought with as a golf club with steel golf balls. He fights and is defeated by Toramaru in the Daiyon Kyousatsu 3rd Assault . During the Dai Ishin Pa-Lien Seiha tournament, Omito swapped with him fearing the 3rd years will not accept a 3rd defeat. It is established during his fight with Centaur that he is naturally blind, but his skills are so good he can perform many tasks a regular blind man can not. He is thought to be killed by Raj Mahal of the Meiou Island 16 Warriors, but he was revived with brain surgery and returns as an enemy against Momo and Otokojuku in The Battle of The Seven Tusks. In the end he regains his memory and returns to Otokojuku.

Other Gogakuren Students 
 : 
 :

Tenchou Gorin Dai Bukai

Promoters

16 Practitioners of Phantom Lizard Style 
(衒蜥流十六衆, Genseki-ryuu Juuroku-shuu)

A group from a martial arts school that specializes in  cooperation techniques, they are Otokojuku’s first opponent in the prelims. They proclaim to be trained at a pro level and refer to the Otokojuku students as "boys", but they are all defeated by J alone.

16 Knights of Bando Style 
(蕃鐃流十六騎, Bandou-ryuu Juurokki)

All members wear hachimakis with  written on them. They fight against Rouroukan in the 2nd preliminary round, but they all have their necks broken by Shuten-Doji’s Kaitou Senkotsusatsu.

Rouroukan 
(狼髏館, Wolf Skull Castle)

Otokojuku's opponents in the Preliminary League.

  (PS2 game). Leader of the 15 Rouroukan. He is a genius master of taijutsu and in his youth learned the Shoukyuu Soudan. He kills Dokugantetsu, who attacks him after he mocks Otokojuku. During his fight with Momo he tries to force him to commit seppuku with the Shoukyuu Soudan, but Momo instead uses his own Shoukyuu Soudan to make him commit seppuku. However, Momo spares his life and makes him miss his vitals, and because of this he reforms. After the tournament ends he enrolls in Otokojuku.

  (audio drama).

16 Fighting Olympus Gods 

  (PS2 game), Norio Wakamoto (audio drama). The chief god of Olympus. His heart, technique, and body are exceedingly powerful and he is completely on par with Jaki Daigouin. Three years ago at the Kanretsu Budou Taikai finals he and Jaki had a tremendous death match that finally ended in a draw after three days. Over the following three years he trains his fist and realizes their skills are indeed equal, so he proposes they settle things with the Snake Blood Contract. He torments Jaki with his Shining God Hands, but Jaki eventually strikes his key muscle with his Fuubu Ourankaku and defeats him. Zeus makes one last attempt to stand, but Jaki knocks him down for good with his Kyouten Kaishoukou. When Jaki tries to give him a serum out of friendship, he rejects him but drinks it without hesitation and kills himself by shoving his fist into his chest.

16 Priests of Gandhara 
  (audio drama). Leader of the 16 Priests of Gandhara and the 57th high priest of Gandhara. After conquering the criminal underworld he participates in the tournament. He keeps blades behind his limbs and hip and because Gandhara village has a perpetually snowy climate he specializes in battle under snowfall. He fights Momo in the finals and nearly defeats him with his snow rats, but Momo defeats him with his Shishi Tourouken, missing his vitals and sparing his life. After the tournament concludes he enrolls in Otokojuku, but unlike the others who enrolled at the same time as him, he was mostly inactive from then on.

  (audio drama)

Paron Kokurenju 

 The head of the Kokurenju. He uses the Shoukeja Gouken which allows him to manipulate countless snakes at will. He corners J on a cliff with his Kyokuousatsu and Jagou Kekkaishuu techniques, but when a crack on the battleground of Akashi's  battle effects their battleground, J is able to defeat the snakes in one clean sweep. With the battleground on the verge of collapse he uses the snakes as a rope, and although he narrowly survives he suggests to J that they stop. After the tournament ends he enrolls in Otokojuku.

  (audio drama)
  (audio drama)

Pharaoh Sphinx 
  (PS2 game), Ikuya Sawaki (audio drama). The legitimate successor of the Pharaoh Sphinx. He fights Momo underneath a solar eclipse, entering as a shining form from a golden coffin. In the middle of his Reincarnation Cycle, his true form lurked in the coffin and he repeatedly threw firefly shaped knives from within. His true form is a large bald man with big ears, and he dominates Momo with his Venus of Ishtar and Agony of Oedipus techniques, but when Momo sees a photo of Edajima that falls from the bag Jaki had given him and becomes riled, he is defeated in a come from behind victory. After the fight ends, he feels in debt to Momo for risking his life to save him when their battleground collapsed, and as proof of their friendship he gives Momo his Tutankhamun's Tear forehead jewel. After the tournament concludes he enrolls in Otokojuku. From the Battle of the Seven Tusks on he is a comical character.

The Excellent Ryozanpaku 16 
  (audio drama)

  (PS2 game). The youngest of the Ryozanpaku Three Heads. He often displays a comical side, but he is actually a child prodigy of Kenpo and a master of Taidousatsu no Hou. In his fight with J he mocks him by drawing a square ring in the sand and saying the first to be knocked out loses. Though he overwhelms J for most of the match, J wins in the end with his Spiral Hurricane Punch. Afterwards, Hakuhou leaves the battleground himself and apologizes for mocking his father. After Ryozanpaku's elimination he is the only surviving one of the Three Heads and vows to rebuild Ryozanpaku, but after the tournament he enrolls in Otokojuku.

  (audio drama). An archer of superb spirit and skill and a master of Ryozanpaku-tou Kyuujutsu. He accurately hits the badge on Togashi's hat from 500 meters away. He faces against Gekkou and his Tengai Soshindan in the Soujou Gekisha, using 10 arrows before hitting him with his Kouinchou Haisatsu.  But he just barely misses his vitals, so Gekkou uses his last 8 shots to perform the Sankou Ryuuseidan and bust Souketsu's arm and evade a second Kouinchou Haisatsu. Souketsu receives the arrow in his chest this time, but Gekkou uses his Tengai Shinten to push it out and spare his life. After the tournament he enrolls in Otokojuku.

16 Warriors of Meiou Island 
  (PS2 game). The commander of the 16 Warriors of Meiou Island. He has studied all forms of combat at the Souryuu Temple and mastered the Shinki Ryuukon.

He is Hyoei Todo's adopted son. He is quite vicious and inhuman, having battled his four "brothers" in a battle to decide who is Todo's son and also killed his own master who stole a secret scroll. However, he has also shown a deep compassionate and honorable side, like when he attacked a subordinate who tried to shoot Michelle while he was saving Togashi.

He had an even match against Momo and his Shinki Fuukon, but the burden of his teammates being imprisoned prevented his Shinki Fuukon, turning it into a one sided match. After the ōendan of his classmates reawakens Momo, Gouki suggests they settle things with the Entou Kyouyutou. He is sure of a victory after he breaks Momo's katana, but Momo ties the katana back together with his hachimaki and uses it as a boomerang to attack from behind, dousing Gouki in flames.

After the flame of Momo's Shinki Fuukon disappears, Hyoei Todo has a sniper shoot him with a tranquilizer bullet. Unaware of this, Gouki overwhelms Momo with his Senretsuken and goes to stab him with his katana, but his katana breaks on the Otokojuku Representative Successorship Proof pendant Jaki had given Momo and instead Momo's fist goes through Gouki's chest. Afterwards Gouki is made aware of Momo's gunshot wound and raises his hand in victory before collapsing.

After the tournament he enrolls in Otokojuku and graduates with Momo and the others. In Ten yori Takaku he has taken over the remains of the Todo Clan.

 A.k.a. , he is a user of the Siberian wolf controlling Rousouken, he also possesses enough monstrous strength to lift a boulder above his head.  He refers to his wolves as his brothers. He nearly beats J with his Tougun San Chuushou, but J uses his Jet Sonic Megaton Punch to break the Todo Statue to bury the wolves underneath the rock.  He then uses his personal taijutsu to fight and overwhelms J with his Binsakai Shousai, Soukaku Byoukou, and Soukaku Houchuusatsu, but J hits him on the crown of his head with his Flying Crash Megaton Punch, burying him up to his head in the ground. Because he abused their feelings during the fight his "brothers" were about to eat his head, but J had broken all their fangs and subsequently saved Gobalski's life. After the tournament ends he enrolls in Otokojuku and, along with Hakuhou and Pharaoh, acts as the comic relief. He has not cleaned his fundoshi in three years.

Battle of Seven Tusks

Tusks of Darkness

1st Tusks: Apparition Tower

2nd Tusks: Path to the Palace

3rd Tusks: Alcatraz Island Prison

4th Tusks: Shinken Temple

5th Tusks: Bugen Castle

Fu'un Rakanjuku 
 is the east's Otokojuku's rival school of the west. They are more westernized and modern than Otokojuku, and use Italian-made blazers as uniforms. 30 years after Kumada and Edajima's oath they hold the  pentathlon to test the schools' courage, intelligence, strength, solidity, and unity.

 The headmaster of Fu'un Rakanjuku. Edajima's rival from his Imperial University days, they are equal at everything and at graduation they were both awarded gold watches for having the best records. Unlike Edajima who is bald and wears a haori and hakama, Kumada has a good physique and wears tailcoats. He is a true man who continues to live for fighting and always admits defeat when he loses.

 The representative of Fuun Rakanjuku who becomes Momo’s rival. He is at the top of both literary and military arts and greatly admires Kumada. He is a bit conceited and often scoffs at people. He proudly appears in the Gokonsen fourth event, family crest exchange. He immediately requests Momo as his opponent and steals his family crest that he took from a bōryokudan office. They save each other after being shot in the back, and because the point of the match was to test unity, the match is then ended.
 A Fu'un Rakanjuku student. He is first seen when he attempts to mug Momo, Toramaru, Matsuo, Tazawa, and Hidemaro while they are enjoying a holiday at Hesneyland. He is about as short as Hidemaro, except he also has some skills at Kenpō and taijutsu with a bit of kicking force. He greatly respects Ijuuin.

 Rikishi siblings of the Taitou Heya. They appear in the first event, sumo. The Otokojuku students view them a bit as celebrities, as their father was a former Ozeki and the present master of the Taito Heya. Since childhood they have been raised with special training and are the three years running All Japan Student Sumo Champion. The sumo world has pinned their hopes on them. The older brother fights Toramaru, while the younger faces against Hidemaro.

 A marathon expert. He appears in the second event, the marathon. He does not believe in will power, but when Togashi narrowly defeats him at the marathon he changes his mind.

 A 6th grader who is accepted into university, he is the three years running winner of the National Student Knowledge Exam. He is a prodigy of prodigies with an IQ of 250. He appears in the third event, mathematics, English, and Japanese. He utterly defeats Tazawa in numerical and Japanese-English translation problems. For the final match (chemistry) he builds a high quality radio out of a pile of electrical parts within 2 hours, but Tazawa makes a high-quality robot, resulting in a draw.

Other characters 
 :  An American who is an student from the United States. He is shown to be a respectful guy towards Momo when he speaks Japanese to introduced himself but he is shown to be a distrustful guy towards the Japanese when his friend, Mick Kong shows up. It is known that Kieth was knowledgeable on Japanese culture but he doesn't know that Mick Kong is a racist but he is not. Kieth was later afraid of a particular American student named J comes to Otokojuku showing disappointment to his favourable school. He was punished by J's circle line called the Ring of Crime but was sent back home to America to learn Japanese more next time when he come back to Japan, possibly won't be return.
 :  An African American who is Kieth's friend from America. He has a hatred towards the Japanese despite beginning the US-Japan Relations in Otokojuku. He was known for his cunning but a powerful skill on boxing. He was defeated by Togashi but it is unknown what happened to him (possibly moving back to the United States.) However, the United States have no choice but to serve Mick an extreme punishment for disrespecting the Japanese on the US-Japan Relations in Otokojuku.
 : 
 : 
 : 
 : 
 : 
 :  An African American boxer who is a huge man who is similar to Mick Kong but with a red shirt. He is a big show-off kind of guy who thinks that all Japanese are stupid people. He really loves Japanese women and he wants to have one as a girlfriend to him but unfortunately, he is defeated by Momo and the Otokojuku gang but it is unknown what happened to George, even if he admitted defeat or he left Japan in disgrace and was sent to be punished in the United States.
 : 
 :

Anime film original characters 
 : Leader of the American team 3S, the semi-finalists of the previous Big Battle August tournament. He is a master of the wind manipulating . He fights and is defeated by Momotaro in the final death match. 
 : A member of 3S and a snobbish man. He trained in England and uses fencing and billiards in his fights. He fights J to a double KO in the first death match. 
 : A member of 3S and a short man. He uses Aikido as well as a thin boomerang which he can also ride on. He fights and is defeated by Toramaru in the second death match. 
 : A member of 3S, he trained in Texas and fights using horse riding and a whip. He is a heartless person who abandoned his own horse when it broke its leg. He fights and defeats Togashi in the third death match, but he dies immediately after when the battleground collapses.
 : A member of 3S and a large man. He is killed in the blink of an eye when he opposes Bruce. 
 The Priest: A priest who acts as an official for the Otokojuku/3S death matches.

Live action film original characters 

 Played by: Masaki Miura. The leader of the Otokojuku second year students. He likes to boss around and abuse the first years. Although a completely different character, he is essentially the replacement for the character Edogawa.

 Played by: Hiroshi Ryōgoku. A member of the Kanto Gogakuren.

 Played by: Tomoko Nakajima. Hidemaro's mother. She grows sick of his profligate ways and enrolls him in Otokojuku, hoping it will straighten him out so he can become a proper leader of the Gokukouji family.

 Played by: Tetsuo Yamada. A member of the Gokukouji group.

 Played by Kaoru Hirata. A girl who Togashi goes out with on his first date.

 Played by Ayano Tsuji.

Otokojuku series
Sakigake!! Otokojuku